Guinea sent a delegation of five athletes compete at the 2008 Summer Olympics in Beijing, China, which included Mariama Dalanda Barry in taekwondo, Fatmata Fofanah (African champion in the women's 100 m hurdles), Djene Barry and Mamadou Cisse in swimming, and Nabie Foday Fofanah in athletics (who competed in the 200 m and 100 m sprint in the 2004 Olympics). Thanks to the use of Simplified Chinese stroke count, it was first after Greece in the parade of nations as it takes only two strokes to write the first character—Guinea-Bissau followed directly behind.

Athletics

Men

Women

Swimming

Men

Women

Taekwondo

References

External links
Tout savoir sur les délégations africaines Jean-François Pérès, Radio France International 31 July 2008

Nations at the 2008 Summer Olympics
2008
Olympics